, also known as My Little Lover, is a Japanese manga series by Shungicu Uchida. It has been adapted into four Japanese television dramas. The manga has been released in France by Éditions IMHO with the title La petite amie de Minami. The theme song of the 2004 drama series is "Hitomi no Naka no Galaxy" by Arashi.

1990 cast
 Hikari Ishida as Chiyomi
 Masaki Kudo as Hiroyuki Minami
 Yasuyo Shirashima
 Naoki Miyashita
 Midori Kiuchi
 Shungicu Uchida
 Haruko Kato

1994 cast
 Yumiko Takahashi as Chiyomi Horikiri
 Shinji Takeda as Hiroyuki Minami 
 Reiko Chiba as Risako Nomura
 Masao Kusakari as Chiyomi's father
 Junji Takada as Hiroyuki's father

2004 cast
 Kyoko Fukada as Chiyomi Horikiri: Another top student and calligrapher who is Susumu's girlfriend. She shrinks down to 16 cm(6 inches) from a curse when he leaves her.
 Kazunari Ninomiya as Susumu Minami: A handsome runner who is Chiyomi's boyfriend and the object of Reika's affections.
 Mao Miyaji as Reika Nomura: A top class student who uses her looks to try and win Minami over. However, Susumu doesn't like her for a personal reason. Wasn't very nice to Chiyomi until much later when Reika realizes how much she did relate to her.
 Asami Abe as Sakura Minami: Susumu's younger sister.
 Masahiko Nishimura as Kenichi Minami: Susumu's father who is hard on him to focus on his studies. He came close a few times to discovering Chiyomi in his son's room.
 Seiichi Tanabe as Seiichiro Kusakabe: Chiyomi's 2nd cousin and Senji's nephew who works as a teacher.
 Soichiro Kitamura as Senji Horikiri: Chiyomi's grandfather who taught her calligraphy and was strict in raising her when her mother(Senji's daughter), Mariko died. When he suffered another heart attack, Susumu and Chiyomi does the right thing to explain themselves to him.
 Tomoya Ishii as Koshiku Ohara: Susumu's best friend who finds out about Chiyomi in her shrunken form. Ohara is the only one who helped find ways to keep others from finding the truth.
 Yuko Natori as Takeko Minami: Susumu's mother who helps Reika cope with her lack of communication with her own parents.

2015 cast
Maika Yamamoto as Chiyomi Horikiri: Member of the dance club and writing her own fantasy stories, which she posts online in installments. Former childhood friend and sweetheart of Shunichi. She shrinks to 15 cm after wishing to go back to her childhood days and a fight she had with her parents
Taishi Nakagawa as Shunichi Minami: Former childhood friend and sweetheart of Chiyomi who formerly practiced kendo and whose father left them when he was younger. He is preparing himself for medical school – he hopes to become a doctor
Erina Nakayama as Sayuri Nomura: A classmate of both Shunichi and Chiyomi. She relates to Shunichi due to a similar situation she is in with her mother disappearing. Most of the male students swoon over Sayuri, giving her the nickname "Pheromones" because they find her so sexy, but she does not seem to have any friends. She is head over heals for Shunichi and often pursues him. When she openly admits her feelings for him, he eventually turns her down and in the end, finally admits his feelings for Chiyomi.
Mirai Suzuki as Riku Tagaki: Another classmate who is friends with Chiyomi and Ami. Riku has feelings for Chiyomi and doesn't like Shunichi for the way he treats her. He suspects that Minami had something to do with Chiyomi's disappearance. In episode 9, Riku learns the truth and confronts Shunichi about it. This leads to him learning about Chiyomi's shrunken form and her true reason for disappearing (she is actually in hiding).
Riko Yoshida as Asuka Horikiri: Chiyomi's sister, who is kind to her. She is friends with Shunichi Minami and is the only one aside from Sayuri he hasn't acted cold around. In Episode 8: she is the first to learn about Chiyomi's shrunken form apart from Shunichi and tries to keep the secret.
Naomi Akimoto as Noriko Horikiri: Chiyomi's strict mother who is a realist, but is also secretly a romantic. She finds Chiyomi in her shrunken form in Episode 10 after Shunichi is in an accident.
Narimi Arimori as Emiko Minami: Shunichi's mother who is worried about her son. Her husband left her, which put her in a bind, having to raise her son alone, but she no longer holds it against him. She later discovers his relationship with Kana and accepts his petition for divorce.
Moe Sasaki as Ami Mikimoto: Chiyomi's best friend, who is in the same dance club. She may have a crush on Riku, but keeps it top secret.
Ichirota Miyagawa as Noburo Minami: Shunichi's father who mysteriously disappears during junior high. He taught Shunichi kendo. It is eventually revealed in episode 5 that Noburo is in a relationship with Sayuri's mother, Kana.
Kouichi Oohori as Jouji Horikiri: Chiyomi's father who works as a florist. He is also strict with Chiyomi when it comes to her future. In Episode 10, he learns about Chiyomi being tiny and faints upon seeing her in Noriko's purse
Kazue Tsunogae as Tomiko Minami: Shunichi's grandmother, who tells him and Chiyomi the legends of Issun-boshi and the one-inch princess known as Issun-hime. Tomiko learns about Chiyomi's shrinking in episode 6, though at first she believes she is the one-inch princess of the legend.

References

External links
https://www.imdb.com/title/tt1181720/
https://www.imdb.com/title/tt2137122/
https://www.imdb.com/title/tt4773436/
 La Petite Amie de Minami at Éditions IMHO 
 Manga review at bdgest.com 
 Manga review at bdzoom.com 
 Manga review at planetebd.com 

Fiction about size change
TV Asahi original programming
1994 Japanese television series debuts
1994 Japanese television series endings
2004 Japanese television series debuts
2004 Japanese television series endings
Japanese television dramas based on manga